This page lists examples of the orders of magnitude of molar concentration. Source values are parenthesized where unit conversions were performed.

All orders

SI multiples

See also
 Molarity
 Osmolarity
 Metric system
 Scientific notation

References

Chemical properties
Molar concentration